Lasiopetalum microcardium is a species of flowering plant in the family Malvaceae and is endemic to the south-west of Western Australia. It is a low, spreading or straggling shrub with hairy stems, heart-shaped leaves and blue, purple or white flowers.

Description
Flowering occurs from August to December.

Taxonomy
Lasiopetalum microcardium was first formally described in 1904 by Ernst Georg Pritzel in Engler's journal Botanische Jahrbücher für Systematik, Pflanzengeschichte und Pflanzengeographie. The specific epithet (microcardium) means "a small heart" referring to the size and shape of the leaves.

Distribution and habitat
This lasiopetalum grows in lateritic soils on ridges and breakaways in the Avon Wheatbelt, Esperance Plains, Jarrah Forest and Mallee biogeographic regions of south-western Western Australia.

Conservation status
Lasiopetalum microcardium is listed as "not threatened" by the Government of Western Australia Department of Biodiversity, Conservation and Attractions.

References

microcardium
Malvales of Australia
Rosids of Western Australia
Taxa named by Ernst Pritzel
Plants described in 1904